The Law of the Snow Country is a 1926 American silent Western film directed by Paul Hurst and starring Kenneth MacDonald, Jane Thomas and Noble Johnson.

Cast
 Kenneth MacDonald as Sergeant Jimmy Burke
 Jane Thomas as Marie
 Noble Johnson as Martell
 William H. Strauss as Father Fajans
 Hazel Howell as The Blonde
 Bud Osborne as Pig Eye Perkins
 Ben Corbett as Jim Wolf
 Billy Cinders as Goofy Joe

References

External links
 

1926 films
1926 Western (genre) films
American black-and-white films
Films directed by Paul Hurst
Silent American Western (genre) films
1920s English-language films
1920s American films